Tarani Debnath (1940 - 19 May 1961) was a Bengali who took part in the Bengali Language Movement in the Barak Valley in 1961 and became a martyr. On 19 May 1961, while participating in a satyagraha demanding the official status for Bengali language in Barak Valley, he was shot dead by the paramilitary forces.

References 

1940 births
1961 deaths
Bengali language movement
Hindu martyrs